National Institute For Research in Reproductive and Child Health (NIRRCH), is a Research institute of the Indian Council of Medical Research (ICMR). It was previously known as the Institute of Research in Reproduction. It was established in 1970, by the joining two ICMR units, the Reproductive Physiology Unit and the Contraceptive Testing Unit.

It is affiliated to the University of Mumbai for M.Sc. and Ph.D. programmes in Biochemistry, Applied Biology and Life Sciences.

References

External links 
 Indian Council of Medical Research 
 Department of Health Research, Government of India.
 University of Mumbai

Indian Council of Medical Research
Medical research institutes in India
Research institutes established in 1970
Research institutes in Mumbai
1970 establishments in Maharashtra